Whirlwind of Paris (French: Tourbillon de Paris) is a 1939 French musical comedy film directed by Henri Diamant-Berger and starring Ray Ventura, Mona Goya and Grégoire Aslan.  The film's sets were designed by the art director Guy de Gastyne and Robert Gys.

Synopsis
A group of students from Grenoble University form an orchestra and try to gain work in Paris.

Cast
 Ray Ventura as himself
 Fernand Charpin as Charbonnier
 Marguerite Pierry as Mme. Charbonnier
 Mona Goya as Marie-Claude
 Jean Tissier as Rosales
 Paul Misraki as Paul
 Claire Jordan as 	Mony
 Ludmilla Pitoëff as Mony
 Grégoire Aslan as Coco
 Jimmy Gaillard as Un collégien
 Robert Ozanne as Julot 
 Paul Demange as Le commissaire
 André Dassary as Un collégien
 Pierre Feuillère as Le compositeur
 Madeleine Suffel as	La caissière
 Claire Gérard as 	La concierge
 Georges Bever as 	Le machiniste
 Milly Mathis as Pâquerette
 Marcel Vallée as Barigoul
 Jeanne Fusier-Gir as 	Mme Marceline
 Marthe Mussine as La deuxième secrétaire
 Georges Flateau as 	Le barman
 André Nicolle as 	Le médecin 
 Georges Paulais as Le pilote

References

Bibliography
 Powrie, Phil & Cadalanu, Marie . The French Film Musical. Bloomsbury Publishing, 2020.

External links

1939 films
1939 musical comedy films
1930s French-language films
Films directed by Henri Diamant-Berger
French black-and-white films
French musical comedy films
1930s French films
Films set in Paris